Bad Tölz-Wolfratshausen – Miesbach is an electoral constituency (German: Wahlkreis) represented in the Bundestag. It elects one member via first-past-the-post voting. Under the current constituency numbering system, it is designated as constituency 223. It is located in southern Bavaria, comprising the districts of Bad Tölz-Wolfratshausen and Miesbach.

Bad Tölz-Wolfratshausen – Miesbach was created for the 2017 federal election. Since 2017, it has been represented by Alexander Radwan of the Christian Social Union (CSU).

Geography
Bad Tölz-Wolfratshausen – Miesbach is located in southern Bavaria. As of the 2021 federal election, it comprises the districts of Bad Tölz-Wolfratshausen and Miesbach.

History

Its constituency number and borders have not changed since its creation.

Members
Alexander Radwan of the Christian Social Union (CSU) was elected in 2017.

Election results

2021 election

2017 election

References

Federal electoral districts in Bavaria
2017 establishments in Germany
Constituencies established in 2017
Bad Tölz-Wolfratshausen
Miesbach (district)